Grapeland Heights is a neighborhood in the city of Miami, Florida, United States. It is just east of Miami International Airport and north of Miami's West Flagler neighborhood. It is primarily a single-family residential neighborhood with a significant maritime industry along the neighborhood's eastern end along the Miami River.

History
In May 2008, Grapeland Water Park opened alongside the Melreese Country Club. The Grapeland Water Park is the first water park to open in Miami. The park is the largest city park in Grapeland Heights, and has proved very popular amongst young Miamians. In June 2011, it received national recognition from the City Parks Alliance chosen for its excellence in design and innovation.

Geography
Grapeland Heights is located between NW 21st Street and the Dolphin Expressway from W 42nd Avenue (LeJeune Road) to the Miami River.

Education
Miami-Dade Public Library operates all area public libraries:

Grapeland Heights Library, now closed replaced by Grapeland Heights waterpark

Transportation
Grapeland Heights is served by Metrobus throughout the area, and by Tri-Rail. The Miami Intermodal Center in Grapeland Heights is served by Miami Metrorail and Tri-Rail.

Metrorail
   Miami Central Station (Airport) (NW 21st Street and 37th Avenue)

Tri-Rail:
  Miami Intermodal Center (NW 21st Street and 37th Avenue)

Places of interest
Grapeland Water Park
Melreese Golf Course

References

Neighborhoods in Miami